Greenstone is a suite of software tools for building and distributing digital library collections on the Internet or CD-ROM. It is open-source, multilingual software, issued under the terms of the GNU General Public License. Greenstone is produced by the New Zealand Digital Library Project at the University of Waikato, and has been developed and distributed in cooperation with UNESCO and the Human Info NGO in Belgium.

The developers of Greenstone received the International Federation for Information Processing's 2004 Namur Award for "contributions to the awareness of social implications of information technology, and the need for an holistic approach in the use of information technology that takes account of social implications."

Greenstone may be used to create large, searchable collections of digital documents. In addition to command line tools for digital collection building, Greenstone has a graphical Greenstone Librarians Interface (GLI) used to build collections and assign metadata.

Through user selected plugins, Greenstone can import digital documents in formats including text, html, jpg, tiff, MP3, PDF, video, and Word, among others. The text, PDF, HTML and similar documents are converted into Greenstone Archive Format (GAF) which is an XML equivalent format.

A project on SourceForge was created in October 2005 for version 3 of Greenstone.
In 2010, Greenstone version 2.83 was included, along with the Koha Integrated Library System, in an Ubuntu Live-Cd.

References 

 K. T. Anuradha and R. Sivakaminathan. 2011. Enhancing full text search capability in library automation package: A case study with Koha and Greenstone digital library software. 2009 International Symposium on Computing, Communication, and Control (ISCCC 2009) Proc .of CSIT vol. 1, p. 330-333.
 George Buchanan, Matt Jones and Gary Marsden. 2002. Exploring small screen digital library access with the Greenstone Digital Library. Research and Advanced Technology for Digital Libraries Lecture Notes in Computer Science, 2458/2002, p. 583–596, .
 Dion Hoe-Lian Goh, Alton Chua, Davina Anqi Khoo, Emily Boon-Hui Khoo, Eric Bok-Tong Mak, and Maple Wen-Min Ng. 2006. A checklist for evaluating open source digital library software, Online Information Review, 30(4):360–379. Includes evaluation of Greenstone relative to other digital library software.
 Michael Lesk. 2004. Understanding digital libraries. Second edition. San Francisco: Morgan Kaufmann Publishers, p. 171-172.
 K.S. Raghavan, A. Neelameghan and S. K. Lalitha. 2010. Co-creation and development of digital library software. Information Studies 16(2):65–72.
 K. Rajasekharan, K.M. Nafala, and Bimal Kanti Sen. 2009. Digital archiving of audio content using WINISIS and Greenstone software: a manual for community radio managers. New Delhi: UNESCO Office New Delhi, p. 73-92.
 Art Rhyno. 2004. Using open source systems for digital libraries. Westport: Libraries Unlimited, p. 83-84.
 B.S. Shivaram and T.B. Rajashekar. 2005. Building Indian language digital library collections: Some experiences with Greenstone software. Digital Libraries: International Collaboration and Cross-Fertilization Lecture Notes in Computer Science, 2005, 3334/2005:189-211, .
 Sharad Kumar Sonkar, Veena Makhija, Ashok Kumar, and Dr Mohinder Singh. 2005. Application of Greenstone Digital Library (GSDL)software in newspapers clippings. DESIDOC Bulletin of Information Technology, 25(3):9–17.
 Walter E. Valero, Claudia A. Perry, and Thomas T. Surprenant. 2007. History on a postcard. Library Journal Net Connect, Winter 2007:6–9.
 Allison B. Zhang and Don Gourley. 2006. Building digital collections using Greenstone digital library software.Internet Reference Services Quarterly, 11(2):71–89.

External links 
 Eprint archive containing easy-to-follow documents on Greenstone Digital Library Software
 
Greenstone beginner's guide
Greenstone Support for South Asia
The New Zealand Digital Library, built with Greenstone

Free institutional repository software
Digital library software
University of Waikato